Józef Kuraś (23 October 1915 – 22 February 1947), noms-de-guerre "Orzeł" (Eagle) and from June 1943 "Ogień" (Fire), was born in Waksmund near Nowy Targ. He served as lieutenant in the Polish Army during the invasion of Poland, and became the underground member of Armia Krajowa and Bataliony Chłopskie in the Podhale region. Soon after the end of World War II, he was one of the leaders of the so-called "cursed soldiers".

Kuraś died in Nowy Targ on 22 February 1947 after attempting suicide, having been ambushed at Ostrowsko by units of the Polish secret police. A controversial historical figure, he has been accused of antisemitism and committing war crimes by multiple groups and organisations, including those representing Jewish and Slovak communities in Poland, and by scholars like Jan T. Gross. In 2006, the Polish president Lech Kaczyński opened an official memorial in Zakopane, in recognition of his resistance efforts.

Early life
Józef Kuraś was born in a Goral family with traditions of engagement in social and patriotic activities. From 1936 until 1938 he served in the Polish army, at first in the 2nd Polish Highland Battalion and then in the Border Protection Corps. On 13 February 1939 he married Elżbieta Chorąży. During the Polish September Campaign, he fought as part of the 2nd Polish Highland Battalion. After the defeat of Poland, he unsuccessfully tried to make his way to Hungary with the hope of joining the Polish army being formed in France. Eventually, he made his way back to his home village where already in November 1939 he joined the anti-Nazi resistance organization Union of Armed Struggle (ZWZ) with a nom de guerre "Orzeł" (Eagle).

In ZWZ and AK
In 1941 "Orzeł" became the leader of a local partisan unit "Konfederacja Tatrzańska" (Tatra Confederation, KT), associated with the pre-war agrarian People's Party (SL). In June 1943, he murdered two plain clothes policemen and in response, on 29 June 1943, the Germans carried out a "pacification" of Waksmund and murdered his father, his wife, his two-year-old son, sent his two brothers to a concentration camp and burned his house. After this, Kuraś changed his pseudonym to "Ogień" (Fire).

In the same year the Gestapo, acting on tips from informants, managed to break up the KT. Those who escaped arrest, including Kuraś ended up joining units of Armia Krajowa, newly formed in the region. At the same time Kuraś kept up his contact with individuals associated with SL.

At the end of December 1943,  the Germans, again with help from informants, managed to surprise the partisans and attacked their camp. As a result, two members of AK were killed. At the time due to the absence of the local AK leader Krystian Wieckowski, "Zawisza", Kuraś, as second in command was in charge. On the initiative of "Zawisza" Kuraś was accused of negligence of duty and blamed for allowing the attack to happen. Despite the fact that Kuraś sent detailed reports and depositions on the incident to the Regional Command of the AK and requested that a thorough investigation be conducted, Kuraś was found guilty and sentenced to death. Because of support of SL members in the AK the sentence was not carried out and in the summer of 1944 it was rescinded.

However, as a result of this incident, Kuraś left the AK and with a group of close friends joined Bataliony Chłopskie the underground military arm of SL-Roch.

In BCh and cooperation with AL
At the end of 1944, with full knowledge of SL leadership, Kuraś established contacts and began cooperating with a newly arrived unit of Armia Ludowa (AL) "For Free Homeland" led by Lt. Isaac Gutman ("Zygfryd") and Soviet partisans. The motivation was twofold. First, joint actions against Germans could be more effective. Second, the agrarians were hoping to be able to introduce their own people into the local government and police once the Soviets arrived (which at the time seemed imminent) and retain at least local control over the region. A similar strategic plan was implemented by the SL in Małopolska. While most of the joint actions carried out by Kuraś and Gutman where directed against the Germans, apparently, during this period, Kuraś also took part in operations against his former colleagues from Armia Krajowa whom the Soviets and the AL treated as hostile forces. Partly for this reason, but also because of his earlier 'desertion' from the AK, some former AK veterans still regard Kuraś as little more than a common bandit.

In December 1944 he delivered a written declaration to Gutman, proclaiming his allegiance to the Soviet-controlled Polish Committee of National Liberation government and voluntarily came under Gutman's command. From then on until the arrival of the Red Army Kuraś together with the AL carried out numerous actions against the Germans. On 31 December 1944, together with Soviet partisans, his unit blew up a German train. On 20 January 1945, together with Gutman's unit, he attacked and dispersed a column of German military trucks and finally, on 27 January, Kuraś used his knowledge of local terrain to lead several companies of the Red Army through the mountains around Nowy Targ enabling the Soviets to outflank German forces which consequently withdrew without a fight.

Working for communist authorities
Once the Podhale region came under Soviet control, Ogień came out of the mountains and led his men into Nowy Targ where, with approval from Gutman, he transformed his partisans into units of Citizen's Militia (MO) (roughly, a police force). Shortly after, communist authorities established the communist Secret Police, Ministry of Public Security of Poland (Urzad Bezpieczenstwa, UB), in the region and Kuraś, again on the recommendation of Gutman, became its commander. He used his position to put his people in key regional government and security posts.

However, it soon became apparent that the SL plan aimed at keeping local control through supporters (like Kuraś) was going to fail, particularly as Communist authorities began sending their own people from outside the region and putting them in top command posts. The new commanders of MO and local leaders of the communist party sent reports against Kuraś to the regional UB office in Kraków (Voivode Office of Public Security in Kraków, WUBP) and as a result he was ordered to report to the Kraków office of the UB. On his way there he was warned by friendly contacts that he was going to be arrested. An alternative version of the story reports that Kuraś himself opened the letters he was charged with delivering to the Kraków WUBP among which he found his own arrest warrant. As a result, after a three-month period as a nominal director of regional UB, on 11 April 1945, Józef Kuraś once again went "to the mountains" and together with some of his old soldiers created the partisan unit "Błyskawica" (Lightning bolt).

Back to the mountains
Between 11 April 1945 and 22 February 1947 "Ogień" fought against communist authorities, the UB and the NKVD and those who supported the new political system of communist Poland. Most of the controversies surrounding Kuraś come from this period and many events have not been fully explained. During this time Kuraś refused to come under the authority of any other major underground anti-communist political or military organization (such as Freedom and Independence) and operated completely on his own.

By 1946, units loyal to Kuraś were active in an area covering most of south central Poland, from the border with Slovakia to the region around Kraków, up to Miechów County.

He had a bunker below Turbacz mountain. He had been doing raids against Slovaks in the villages of Nedeca, Falštín, Frydman, Krempachy, Nová Belá, Čierna Hora, Repiská, Jurgov, Durštín, Tribš, Vyšné Lapše, Lapšanka, Nižné Lapše and Kacvín. The aforementioned communes are in Upper Spiš region. He also used to attack villages in Upper Orava region. He was giving judgments of death to The Slovak population, stealing cattle and demanding money from the villagers. Because of above-mentioned facts many Slovaks opted to move to other neighbouring towns in Slovakia.

According to secret police sources who fought against him, "Ogień"'s unit (the Ogniowcy) numbered around 700 soldiers. Out of these, 320 "revealed" themselves as a result of the amnesty law of 22 February 1947 (passed on the day that Kuraś died); nevertheless a good many of them were later arrested, charged and sentenced anyway. In total, 184 members of his unit were captured, and of those 32 were sentenced to death and 21 were actually executed (the sentences of the rest were commuted). Some 88 members of the unit died during this period, and this number includes those who were executed on the orders of Kuraś himself for banditry and/or treason (UB informants were partly successful in infiltrating his unit). The fate of the rest of the partisans is unknown.

The UB documents state that "Ogień"'s partisans killed more than 60 functionaries of the secret police (UB), 40 members of the MO and 27 members of the NKWD. If the data from purported diary of "Ogień" (see below) is taken as true, he himself claimed that his unit killed 84 UB functionaries.

On 21 April 1946 Józef Kuraś was married for the second time, to Czesława Polaczyk. Both the public wedding in a church in Ostrowsko and the wedding party held the next day in a nearby town were manifestations of Ogień's strength and control over the area.

Death
In autumn 1946 the communist authorities began a major offensive against Kuraś' partisans. On 21 January 1947 "Ogień", while staying in a friendly village (Ostrowsko) with six of his fighters found himself surrounded by units of UB and MO (altogether numbering around 50 personnel) which had been tipped off as to his whereabouts by one their informants (a UB agent within Kuraś' unit ps. "Wanda"). During the ensuing gun fight two of the Ogniowcy were killed (including "Ogień"'s brother, Krzysztof Kuraś), two managed to escape, while Kuraś himself, along with Irena Olszewska, ps. "Hanka", slipped away and hid in a nearby building. However, after setting fire to the original house in which Kuraś and his men defended themselves, the UB quickly realized what had happened. At that point, Kuraś gave "Hanka" an order to surrender herself and after she did so, shot himself in the head. He did not die immediately and as a result was taken, unconscious to the hospital in Nowy Targ where he died the following day.

He was buried in an unmarked grave whose location remains unknown to this day.

Controversy and Kuraś' diary
There is a considerable amount of evidence presented by historians suggesting that Kuraś was personally guilty of a number of war crimes and advocated ethnic cleansing.
Furthermore, the Slovakian equivalent of the IPN disputes his portrayal as a hero.

Most of the controversy  around Kuraś centers around material found in his supposed diaries. To complicate matters there are actually three sets of documents that are sometimes referred to as "Kuraś' diary".

Kuraś remains a controversial figure even in his home region. This is further complicated by his disdain for those who identified as Goralenvolk and his alleged violent retribution against local supporters of the established communist government.

According to Marcel Jesenský, "Kuraś personifies the famous dictum of the former US President Ronald Reagan: 'One man’s terrorist is another man’s freedom fighter.'"

Notes and references

Literature
 Bolesław Dereń: Józef Kuraś "Ogień". Partyzant Podhala, Muzeum Historii Polskiego Ruchu Ludowego, 
 Jerzy S. Łątka: Bohater na nasze czasy? Józef Kuraś, Ogień z Waksmundu - porucznik czasu wojny, Towarzystwo Słowaków w Polsce, 2007, 
 Władysław Machejek: Rano przeszedł huragan, Warszawa, Wydawn. MON, 1973;

External links
 
 Paweł Smoleński, Koszmar był, odszedł i go nie ma?
 Mjr Józef Kuraś „Ogień” i Zgrupowanie Partyzanckie „Błyskawica” in Gazeta Wyborcza
 Maciej Korkuć, "Horror podmalowany" in Tygodnik Powszechny
  Multimedia exhibit "O orła w koronie", Krakowski Oddział Instytutu Pamięci Narodowej. Zgrupowanie partyzanckie "Błyskawica"
 Byłem kronikarzem Ognia

1915 births
1947 deaths
People from Nowy Targ County
Polish Army officers
Cursed soldiers
Prisoners who died in Polish People's Republic detention
Home Army members
Military personnel who committed suicide
Polish military personnel of World War II
Suicides by firearm in Poland